Ibn Shaddad can refer to:
Abd al-Aziz ibn Shaddad, 12th-century Zirid chronicler
Antarah ibn Shaddad (fl. 580), pre-Islamic Arab hero and poet 
Baha ad-Din ibn Shaddad, 12th-century jurist and biographer of Saladin
Izz al-Din ibn Shaddad, 13th-century geographer and historian
Muhammad ibn Shaddad (died 971), founder of the Kurdish Shaddadid dynasty